Laure (also known as Forever Emmanuelle and Laura) is a 1976 Italian erotic film directed by Louis-Jacques Rollet-Andriane and Roberto D'Ettorre Piazzoli, even though the film was advertised as directed by Emmanuelle Arsan.

Cast
 Annie Belle as Laure
 Al Cliver as Nicola
 Orso Maria Guerrini as Professor Gualtier Morgan
 Michele Starck as Natalie Morgan
 Emmanuelle Arsan as Myrte

Production
The first choice for the title role was Linda Lovelace, but due to her personal problems at the time, she was first recast in the secondary role of Natalie Morgan, and eventually put out of the film. It was shot in the Philippines and in Rome on a reported budget of $2 million. The producer, Assonitis, and advertised director, Arsan, took their names off of the film.

Release
The film was distributed in certain territories by 20th Century Fox and was not released in English-speaking countries until December 1982.

References

External links

1976 films
Adultery in films
Italian erotic drama films
1970s erotic drama films
English-language Italian films
Films scored by Franco Micalizzi
1976 directorial debut films
1970s English-language films
1970s Italian films